Case Closed, known as  (officially translated as Detective Conan) in Japan, is written by Gosho Aoyama and serialized in Shogakukan's Weekly Shōnen Sunday. The series began its serialization on January 19, 1994. Since Case Closed'''s premiere, over 1000 chapters have been released in Japan, making it the 21st longest running manga series. Several adaptations based on Case Closed have been made, including an anime series and animated films. A database consisting of all the cases from the manga was launched in 2007. Viz Media announced its licensing of the series on June 1, 2004, and following Funimation Entertainment's English localization, released the series under the name Case Closed with renamed characters. The series follows high school detective Jimmy Kudo who was transformed into a child after being forced to ingest an experimental poison.

Shogakukan collected the individual chapters into tankōbon volumes in Japan. The first volume was released on June 18, 1994 and is currently on-going. In addition, Gosho Aoyama's assistants have also written and published volumes their own side stories of Case Closed. Ani-manga tankōbon based on the Case Closed films have also been released by Shogakukan with each movie cut into two parts.

Viz Media licensed the manga and released the first English adapted volume on September 7, 2004. Victor Gollancz Ltd used Viz Media's translation to release the 15 volumes in the United Kingdom before ceasing publication of manga. (Viz Media has since re-released them.)  On July 22, 2009, Viz Media uploaded a website containing its licensed series from Weekly Shōnen Sunday; the first chapter of Case Closed was uploaded to the website on October 21, 2009.

The series has been released internationally under the name Detective Conan''. The manga series is licensed for additional regional language releases by Changchun Publishing House in China; Kana in France and the Countries of Benelux (in French); Egmont Manga & Anime in Germany, Austria and Switzerland; Elex Media Komputindo in Indonesia; Star Comics in Italy; Chingwin Publishing Group in Taiwan; Kim Dong Publishing House in Vietnam; and Planeta DeAgostini within Spain for both Spanish- and Catalan.

Egmont licensed series in Sweden, Norway, Finland and Denmark, but dropped them either because low sales (Sweden), unknown reason (Denmark and Norway) or when Egmont closed its manga-publishing division in 2013 (Finland).

Volume list

Volumes 1–20

Volumes 21–40

Volumes 41–60

Volumes 61–80

Volumes 81–current

Manga Special Editions
Special editions that are drawn by Aoyama's assistants and do not belong to the main plot. Forty-three volumes have been released as of May 2018.

Anime films

References
General
 
 
 
Specific